Saryarka or Saryarqa may refer to:

 Kazakh Uplands (Kazakh: Сарыарқа, Saryarqa), a large grassland in Kazakhstan
 Saryarka – Steppe and Lakes of Northern Kazakhstan, a UNESCO World Heritage Site in the Kazakh Uplands
 Sary-Arka Airport, Karagandy, Kazakhstan
 Saryarka Karagandy, an ice hockey team from Karagandy, Kazakhstan
 Saryarka Velodrome, a cycle-racing arena in Nur-Sultan, Kazakhstan
 Saryarqa (Almaty Metro), a railway station in Almaty, Kazakhstan